George Brintnall Dutton (October 7, 1818 – April 5, 1898) was an American businessman and politician.

Dutton was born in Charlestown, New  Hampshire and was a contractor. He lived with his wife and family in St. Anthony, Minnesota Territory. Dutton served in the Minnesota Territorial House of Representatives in 1853, He died in Waco, Texas.

References

1818 births
1898 deaths
People from Charlestown, New Hampshire
People from St. Anthony, Minnesota
Businesspeople from Minnesota
Members of the Minnesota Territorial Legislature